Shirin Shahr() is a new planned city in the Khuzestan province of Iran. It is intended to house the personnel of the sugar industry in the area. The name Shirin Shahr means "Sweet City" in Persian.

See also

List of Iran's planned cities

Populated places in Ahvaz County
Planned cities in Iran